Lukáš Dostál (born June 22, 2000) is a Czech professional ice hockey goaltender for the  Anaheim Ducks of the National Hockey League (NHL). He was selected by the Ducks in the third round, 85th overall, of the 2018 NHL Entry Draft.

Playing career
Dostál signed with HC Kometa Brno youth setup in 2012 and played in their U16, U18 and U20 teams. He made his professional debut in 2017 with SK Horácká Slavia Třebíč of the second-tier WSM Liga (now Chance Liga)

Dostál entered the 2018 NHL Entry Draft as the number one ranked European prospect goaltender and was selected 85th overall by the Anaheim Ducks.

Dostál made his full debut for Kometa Brno's senior team during the 2017–18 Champions Hockey League and made his Czech Extraliga debut during the 2018–19 season before going out of a second loan spell with Slavia Třebíč. On February 5, 2019, Dostál under contract with Kometa until 2021, was loaned to the Liiga with Finnish club, Ilves. He appeared in 10 games, collecting 4 wins while recording a 1.80 goals against average.

On May 14, 2019, Dostál was signed to a three-year, entry-level contract with the Anaheim Ducks. On January 9, 2022, Dostál made his NHL debut and made 33 saves in the Ducks 4–3 shootout win over the Detroit Red Wings.

On March 2, 2022, Dostál scored an empty net goal for the San Diego Gulls, becoming the 17th goaltender in AHL history and first in Gulls history to do so. In addition, he made 51 saves to earn the win.

Career statistics

Regular season and playoffs

International

References

External links
 

2000 births
Living people
Anaheim Ducks draft picks
Anaheim Ducks players
Czech ice hockey goaltenders
HC Kometa Brno players
KOOVEE players
Ilves players
San Diego Gulls (AHL) players
SK Horácká Slavia Třebíč players
Ice hockey people from Brno
Czech expatriate ice hockey players in the United States
Czech expatriate ice hockey players in Finland